Carpobrotus glaucescens, commonly known as pigface or iceplant, is a species of flowering plant in the family Aizoaceae and is endemic to eastern Australia. The fruits ripen mainly in Summer and Autumn. It usually only grows very close to the sea.

Description
The flowers are superficially daisy-like, more or less sessile,  in diameter with 100 to 150 light purple to deep pinkish-purple staminodes arranged in three or four rows and white near the base. There are about 300 to 400 stamens in five or six rows and seven to ten styles.

Taxonomy
Pigface was first formally described in 1812 by Adrian Hardy Haworth who gave it the name Mesembryanthemum glaucescens in his book  Synopsis Plantarum Succulentarum, but in 1928, Martin Schwantes changed the name to Carpobrotus glaucescens.

Distribution and habitat
Carpobrotus glaucescens occurs in near-coastal areas of Queensland south from near Mackay to New South Wales and the far east of Victoria where it has been confused with C. rossii. It is also found on Norfolk Island and Lord Howe Island. There is a population on the Coromandel Peninsula in New Zealand but it may be an introduced species there.

Uses
The fruit of C. glaucescens was used by Aboriginal peoples as a food source. The flesh of the fruit is said to have a taste similar to salty apples. The fleshy leaves may be eaten either raw or cooked; roasted, they can be used as a salt substitute. Early European explorers used the plant as an anti-scurvy treatment. The juice of the leaves can also be used to relieve burnt skin or to soothe stings, such as from biting midges or Portuguese man o' war (Physalia physalis).

References

glaucesens
Flora of New South Wales
Flora of Norfolk Island
Flora of Lord Howe Island
Flora of Queensland
Flora of Victoria (Australia)
Taxa named by Adrian Hardy Haworth
Plants described in 1812